The Minnesota Ripknees were an American basketball team of the American Basketball Association (ABA). The Ripknees briefly joined the Premier Basketball League after starting playing one season in the ABA.

The team gets its unusual name after "Ripknee", a character in stories (with a hole in the knee of his blue jeans) which former co-owner John Jurewicz used to tell his son, William (also a former co-owner) on long car trips. The team ceased operations after 2008.

History 
Playing their home games at the Gangelhoff Center, Minnesota finished their inaugural 2006-07 season 24-8, good for first place in their division. However, a financial dispute prevented the team from participating in the playoffs.

After the season, the team announced they would switch their affiliation to the Premier Basketball League and would now be playing at the Roy Wilkins Auditorium (which previously served as the alternate home of the Minneapolis Lakers) next to the Xcel Energy Center in St.Paul.

Before the Ripknees could ever take a shot in the PBL, they were sold to Jam Entertainment (owners of the Rochester Fire, Peoria Kings, and Rome Legions). The Ripknees returned to the ABA to play the 2007-08 season.

According to a report on Our Sports Central, the Ripknees ceased playing in the ABA before the end of the 2007-08 season.

Players from Minnesota on the Ripknees 
 Johnny Gilbert, Minneapolis Henry HS (2000) - University of Oklahoma
 Levi Jones, Minneapolis North HS (1999) - Minneapolis CTC and University of Nebraska-Omaha
 Mitch Ohnstad, Faribault HS (1996) - Cal Poly and University of Minnesota
 Lucas Olson-Patterson, Robbinsdale Cooper HS (2001) - Augsburg College
 Tyrell Sledge, Minneapolis Henry HS (2002) - Emporia State
 Jamel Staten, Minneapolis North HS (2001) - Minnesota State Mankato

References

External links
Minnesota Ripknees on USbasket.com

Defunct American Basketball Association (2000–present) teams
Sports in Minneapolis–Saint Paul
Basketball teams in Minnesota
Former Premier Basketball League teams
Basketball teams established in 2006
Basketball teams disestablished in 2008